Call of Duty: Vanguard is a 2021 first-person shooter game developed by Sledgehammer Games and published by Activision. It was released on November 5 for PlayStation 4, PlayStation 5, Windows, Xbox One, and Xbox Series X/S. It serves as the 18th installment in the overall Call of Duty series. Vanguard establishes a storyline featuring the birth of the special forces to face an emerging threat at the end of the war during various theatres of World War II.

The game received mixed reviews from critics, with praise towards the entertainment value of the campaign and multiplayer, and the graphics, but criticism for its writing, Zombies mode, and lack of innovation. It failed to meet the sales expectations of Activision.

Gameplay

Campaign 
Vanguard's campaign features similar gameplay mechanics previously introduced in Modern Warfare, such as the player being able to mount wielded weapons to flat surfaces, interact with doors and execute takedowns. New gameplay features allow the player the ability to use a more advanced tactical approach in combat such as blind firing from behind cover, breaking through destructible environmental elements or creating new paths to complete objectives by climbing walls.

Multiplayer 
Vanguard's multiplayer mode introduces a new game mode to the series, titled "Champion Hill", a successor to the mode "Gunfight", a 2v2 arena mode previously featured in Call of Duty: Modern Warfare and Call of Duty: Black Ops Cold War. Champion Hill tasks players with surviving as long as possible in a squad-based deathmatch, round-robin tournament. Season 2 of Vanguard introduces "Arms Race", a large-scale game mode where two teams of 12 players attempt to capture five bases, or destroy them; players can also earn cash from kills and complete objectives to buy custom loadouts and killstreaks. A new feature introduced to the Call of Duty series through Vanguard's multiplayer is "Combat Pacing". This allows the player to have more control over the selection of multiplayer game modes through three pre-defined pacing filters favoring different playstyles. As an addition to the returning Gunsmith system, Vanguards multiplayer features a "Caliber system", which brings greater destructibility and reactive environments to maps through different ammunition types.

As with Cold War, Vanguard is integrated with Warzone, allowing players to progress and use weapons, operators and other cosmetics items across both titles, in addition to the existing Modern Warfare and Cold War items in Warzone. Like prior Call of Duty installments since 2019, Vanguard's multiplayer is also fully cross-platform play compatible, with support for cross-generation gaming regarding eighth and ninth generation home video game consoles.

Zombies 
The cooperative Zombies mode returns in Vanguard, developed by Treyarch in collaboration with Sledgehammer Games. The mode is considered an expansion of the Dark Aether story, and acts as a prologue to Black Ops Cold War's story. At launch, the game features a new map titled "Der Anfang", which combines aspects of round-based survival gameplay with the objective-based gameplay of Outbreak and Onslaught, both new gamemodes introduced in Cold War. Gameplay elements from Cold War return in Vanguard, such as Essence and Salvage currencies, and Dark Aether-powered field upgrades, in addition to classic Zombies gameplay items like perks and the Pack-a-Punch machine. A new gameplay feature, the Altar of Covenants, allows players to purchase randomized buffs every round, allowing a variety in combat builds. Post-launch updates for Zombies feature additional objectives for Der Anfang, including a main quest for story progression, as well as new Covenants and field upgrades. An additional hub map, "Terra Maledicta", was also added to the game in February 2022 as part of the Season 2 content update. Classic round-based maps were announced for Vanguard in April 2022, with the first map, a remake of the Call of Duty: World at War map "Shi no Numa", slated for release in Season 4.

Plot

Characters and settings 
Vanguard's single-player campaign takes place in 1945 near the end of World War II's European theater, with various flashbacks ranging from 1941 to 1944. The story of Vanguard is told throughout various points in time in a non-chronological order. The flashbacks portray various major battles such as the Battle of Stalingrad and Midway through the eyes of the main protagonists. The game portrays the rise of special forces, with the first tasked to uncover a secret Nazi project and thwart it. The player takes control of various members of Task Force Vanguard, a team formed by the Special Operations Executive to uncover Phoenix, a secret Nazi project. Members include team leader British Army Lieutenant Arthur Kingsley (Chiké Okonkwo), his right-hand man Richard Webb (Simon Quarterman), Red Army sniper Polina Petrova (Laura Bailey), U.S. Navy pilot Wade Jackson (Derek Phillips), Australian Army demolitionist Lucas Riggs (Martin Copping), and Milos Novak, a Czechoslovak partisan fighter. Supporting characters appear in flashbacks, including British Army Corporal Thomas Jones (Max Deacon), Polina's brother Misha Petrov (Mark Ivanir), Aviation Machinist Mate 3rd Class Mateo Hernandez (Christopher Rivas), Private Desmond "Des" Wilmot (Nikolai Nikolaeff), and Robert Jacobs (Jack Hawkins). Opposing Task Force Vanguard is Project Phoenix, a secret Nazi project led by Untersturmführer Hermann Freisinger (Dan Donohue) aiming to take the party underground. Other antagonists include Hauptsturmführer Jannick Richter (Dominic Monaghan), the interrogator of Task Force Vanguard while they are captured, SS-Oberst-Gruppenführer Leo Steiner (Ray Proscia), the commander in charge of invading Stalingrad, and British Army Major Henry Hamms (James Frain), who frequently antagonizes the Australians in North Africa.

The multiplayer mode's seasonal story takes place after the campaign, across multiple eras, and features Captain Carver Butcher (Ron Bottitta), the founder of Task Force Vanguard, leading other special forces teams on covert missions to take down global Nazi operations. The final season of Vanguard, which is not canon to the seasonal story, features several villains from previous Call of Duty titles as playable characters: Raul Menendez (Kamar de los Reyes) from Black Ops II and Black Ops 4, Khaled Al-Asad (Michael Benyaer) from Modern Warfare (2019), He "Seraph" Zhen-Zhen (Judy Alice Lee) from Black Ops III and Black Ops 4, and Gabriel Rorke (Kevin Gage) from Ghosts.

The Zombies story takes place in early 1944, and depicts a team of Special Forces operators being drafted into a battle against an undead army, led by Oberführer Wolfram Von List (Kaiser Johnson), commander of SS unit Die Wahrheit. Von List possesses the power to raise the dead, thanks to his symbiotic link with a Dark Aether entity named Kortifex the Deathless (Jason Marnocha). Assisting the Special Forces team is Professor Gabriel Krafft (Darin De Paul), a demonologist who was forced to work for Von List and help him uncover the Dark Aether artifacts. Krafft provides the Special Forces operators with other artifacts, which allow them to form their own symbiotic links with four other entities: Saraxis the Shadow (Alexa Kahn), Inviktor the Destroyer (Regi Davis), Norticus the Conqueror (Wally Wingert) and Bellekar the Warlock (Abby Craden). Additional Dark Aether entities later join the conflict, including Vercanna the Last (Jodi Carlisle), who allies with the Special Forces team, and Zaballa the Deceiver, Kortifex's lieutenant.

Synopsis

Campaign 
NOTE: The campaign story of Vanguard is told throughout various points in time in a non-chronological order.

In August 1941, 2nd Lieutenant Lucas Riggs is stationed at Tobruk as part of the Australian-led Rats of Tobruk garrison in Siege of Tobruk. After a failed ambush attempt against a German Afrika Korps convoy, Riggs is assigned to recover supplies for the British Army, alongside fellow Rat Private Desmond "Des" Wilmot and British Lieutenant Richard Jacobs. Riggs, Des and Jacobs manage to find intelligence relating to General Erwin Rommel, and destroy an enemy depot in the process, but they were detained by Major Henry Hamms for insubordination. In October 1942, during the Second Battle of El Alamein, Riggs and the Rats are ordered by Hamms to form a defensive line, but Riggs disobeys the command and tries to retake a hill and call in bomber support with Des supporting him. The two of them succeed, though Des is killed in action. Angered by the disregard for the Rats' contribution to the fight, Riggs punches Hamms out of frustration, resulting in him facing prison time.

In June 1942, United States Navy pilot Lieutenant Wade Jackson participates in the Battle of Midway with his tail gunner, Aviation Machinist's Mate Mateo Hernandez. In November 1943, while assaulting the Imperial Japanese Armed Forces in Bougainville, Jackson and Hernandez's plane is shot down, and the two are captured by IJA soldiers. They are rescued by the 93rd Infantry Division, who later help them acquire an Aichi D3A to assist the division in reclaiming the island.

In August 1942, Red Army nurse Polina Petrova witnesses the German Wehrmacht invade Stalingrad. She fails to save her father Boris from being executed by enemy troops, but is able to escape with her brother Misha and several Soviet partisans. Petrova eventually acquires the nickname "Lady Nightingale" as she pursues Leo Steiner, the German commander responsible for the invasion. In January 1943, Petrova and Misha attempt to assassinate Steiner in Stalingrad, but Misha is severely wounded. He sacrifices himself to buy Petrova time to escape. Petrova eventually confronts Steiner and kills him and his personal army, inspiring the citizens of Stalingrad to reclaim the city from the Nazis. She then sets her sight on Steiner's superior, Hermann Freisinger.

In June 1944, British paratrooper Sergeant Arthur Kingsley takes part in Operation Tonga, where he and the Parachute Regiment help destroy the Merville Gun Battery and several other bridges to assist the Allied forces in invading Normandy. Kingsley befriends fellow paratrooper Sergeant Richard Webb, who would later become Kingsley's right-hand man.

Kingsley, Webb, Petrova, Jackson and Riggs, alongside a sixth soldier named Milos Novak, would eventually be recruited by Captain Carver Butcher to form the first special operations task force, callsign Vanguard. Kingsley is appointed as the leader of the task force. In April 1945, Task Force Vanguard hijacks a train to Hamburg in search of intelligence regarding Project Phoenix, a secret Nazi program run by Freisinger. While infiltrating a Nazi submarine, the squad is captured by Freisinger's men, minus Jackson who evaded them, and Novak who is bludgeoned to death by Freisinger. Vanguard is delivered to the Gestapo headquarters in Berlin, where Freisinger appoints Schutzstaffel officer Jannick Richter to interrogate them. Jackson is also later captured after attempting to steal a plane at the Berlin Tempelhof Airport; Richter demoralizes the squad by executing Webb.

Being unaware of Project Phoenix's purpose and Freisinger's involvement, Richter attempts to learn more by interrogating Petrova and Riggs about Steiner and Rommel's connection to Freisinger. He deduces that the project was a coup attempt, in order to appoint Freisinger as the new Führer of the Fourth Reich. As Berlin falls under siege by the Red Army following Adolf Hitler's suicide, Riggs breaks out of interrogation and frees the squad, while Kingsley kills Richter to avenge Webb. Vanguard pursues Freisinger to Tempelhof, where they finally apprehend him and burn him alive. The four then board Freisinger's plane, discovering numerous German documents and assets, revealing global Nazi covert operations. Kingsley decides to follow up on Project Aggregat, a secret V2 rocket facility, and orders Jackson to fly there in pursuit.

Multiplayer/Warzone 
In December 1944, Captain Butcher begins to oversee Operation Vulcan, a top-secret Special Operations Executive mission to hunt down Axis soldiers and scientists who fled to the South Pacific. Butcher deploys with Task Force Trident to Caldera Island in pursuit of Nazi activities, but their plane is shot down by anti-air, leaving the three Trident members stranded from Butcher. As the task force attempts to navigate the island, Butcher stumbles upon the entrance to a Nazi bunker at the beach where he crash-landed. The intel recovered from Caldera reveals that the Nazis were working on a new chemical weapon, dubbed "Nebula V". Butcher travels to the Swiss Alps with Task Force Yeti, intending to recover Nebula V from a nearby Nazi fortress. The Yeti members storm the fortress, but are unable to stop the Nazi commander from releasing the Nebula V gas. They barely manage to escape as the gas engulfs the fortress.

The Nazis begin to deploy Nebula V across the world, hitting major cities such as Paris and London, as well as Caldera. In March 1951, Butcher dispatches Task Force Harpy to Caldera to intercept a Nazi arms convoy, where they find a radio emitting a mysterious primal sound. Butcher laments that the release of Nebula V has awakened something powerful near Caldera. The island would eventually become a battleground between two gigantic monsters, the kaiju Godzilla and the gorilla Kong.

As the years go by, the operators under Butcher's command begin to take up mercenary work, in pursuit of Nazi gold and other sources of wealth. By 1976 Butcher leads his own squad, Task Force Immortal, to investigate the crash site of a helicopter carrying a gold shipment, but is met with hostility from Kingsley, who has formed his own mercenary team comprising members of other task forces.

Zombies 
In March 1944, following the activation of the cyclotron in Projekt Endstation by the Nazis in Morasko, Poland, various ancient artifacts recovered by the SS unit Die Wahrheit are activated, allowing several entities from the Dark Aether dimension to reach out to the real world. One such entity, Kortifex the Deathless, forms a symbiotic bond with Oberführer Wolfram Von List, Die Wahrheit's commander, and bestows him the power to resurrect the dead. A team of Special Forces operators responds to an emergency broadcast from Professor Gabriel Krafft, a demonologist forced to work for Von List, and is drafted into a new battle against Von List and Kortifex's undead army. Krafft assists the operators in battling the undead, by also supplying them with Dark Aether artifacts which allow them to form bonds with four other Dark Aether entities: Saraxis the Shadow, Inviktor the Destroyer, Norticus the Conqueror and Bellekar the Warlock, all of whom wish to thwart Kortifex's plan.

The Special Forces operators eventually discover a Dark Aether portal in Von List's office in Stalingrad, where they find a sealed page from the Tome of Rituals, an ancient spell book that was used to summon the Dark Aether entities. While the four allied entities devise a plan to recover the missing page, they also learn that another entity, Vercanna the Last, has responded to Bellekar's call for help, and is willing to join the fight against Kortifex. Using a portal opened by Vercanna, the operators travel to Egypt, where they continue their fight against Von List's forces and attempt to recover the sealed Tome page. Kortifex sends one of his underlings, Zaballa the Deceiver, to stop the operators from completing their mission. Vercanna guides the operators in recovering the Decimator Shield, a living weapon once belonged to a warrior of Kortifex's Night Legions. Using the shield, they destroy energy orbs chained to the missing Tome page in the Void, allowing them to recover it. Both Krafft and Bellekar conclude that the missing page may have clues as to how they can separate Kortifex's artifact from Von List, severing their connection.

The Special Forces operators travel to "Shi No Numa" (lit. translation: Swamp of Death), a Die Wahrheit excavation site where Saraxis's artifact was first discovered. The team learns from Krafft that a relic located here was used to sever Saraxis from her original human host, which they need in order to do the same to Kortifex and Von List. Saraxis, however, has forgotten her earlier memories of the relic, and is unable to help them. Vercanna instructs the team to power up an ancient monolith, which reveals an echo of Saraxis's past. The echo reveals that the relic was a mirror, broken into two pieces. The operators recover the mirror pieces and put them back together. The echo is summoned once more, this time taking the shape of Saraxis. The echo lashes out at Saraxis, revealing that she was once Kortifex's consort; however she was punished by the former for bearing his child, having her memories wiped and herself turned into his servant. The echo attempts to kill the Special Forces team, but fails. As the mirror is fully restored, Saraxis's memories return, making her remember Kortifex's endgame: to seize control of an object called "the Construct".

The Special Forces operators return to the dig site in Egypt, where they use the relic mirror to separate Kortifex from Von List. Kortifex renounces Von List and teleports him to Krafft's location, while he travels to the Dark Aether to claim the powers of the Construct. Through Von List and the entities, the operators and Krafft learn that the Construct is an ancient living monolith, which has the ability to grant its powers to individuals and make them its "Archon". They also learn that Kortifex has sought to become the Archon several millennia before, but was rejected by the Construct. The Special Forces team then seeks out and complete three trials, which grants them passage to the Dark Aether to face the Construct. Krafft, upon learning that Von List has murdered his lover Sasha, retaliates by killing him. The operators enter the Dark Aether and battle Kortifex, who has become the new Archon of the Construct. They eventually manage to kill Kortifex and emerge victorious.

Development 
Vanguard is the third title developed by Sledgehammer Games in the Call of Duty franchise after 2014's Call of Duty: Advanced Warfare and 2017's Call of Duty: WWII.

After WWII was released, the studio went through a rebuilding process regarding the organisational structure following the departure of the studio co-founders and directors Glen Schofield and Michael Condrey. In an interview made by VentureBeat about the rebuilding and the path leading Sledgehammer Games to develop Vanguard, Studio Head Aaron Halon highlighted that "[...] we love our legacy and what we’ve created, but we also wanted to think about the future of the studio and how we could set ourselves up to be even stronger. [...] we're proud of the decisions we’ve made along the way that have led us to where we're at today with Call of Duty: Vanguard."

Originally the three-year primary developer rotation cycle between Infinity Ward, Treyarch and Sledgehammer Games, in which the model was first introduced in 2012, it was expected to be continued in 2020 with Sledgehammer taking the lead to create a new Call of Duty entry alongside Raven Software. Due to conflicts of interest between the two, responsibilities were shifted to Treyarch as they took control over the project, which resulted in developing Black Ops Cold War in 2020.

During Activision Q1 earnings call in May 2021, it was confirmed that the development of a new Call of Duty game is being led by Sledgehammer Games due for release in Q4 2021. The developer also confirmed this on its official Twitter account. Activision Blizzard President and Chief Operating Officer Daniel Alegre said: "We are very excited for this year's premium Call of Duty release. Development is being led by Sledgehammer Games. And the game is looking great and on track for its fall release. This is a built-for-next-generation experience with stunning visuals across campaign, multiplayer and cooperative modes of play designed to both integrate with and enhance the existing COD [Call of Duty] ecosystem. We look forward to sharing more details with the community soon."

Vanguard is built on an upgraded version of the IW 8.0 engine, that powered Modern Warfare. The game's visuals are developed in part using photogrammetry and new volumetric lighting techniques while also introducing reactive and destructible environmental graphical details and textures with a damage layer system which reacts to bullet impacts hitting different surfaces.

Marketing and release

Reveal 
In August 2021, some insider sources began to leak information about Vanguard prior to its official reveal, including its editions and reveal trailer content. Official social media accounts for Call of Duty acknowledged this leak in a "humorous" fashion, and proceeded to tease the game's reveal. Around the same time, the first teaser for Vanguard went live within Call of Duty: Warzone, where winning players in any given Battle Royale matches may be sniped from afar by Vanguard protagonist Polina Petrova during the extraction cutscene. A week after, the title of the game was announced, alongside a reveal event taking place in Warzone. Players got to participate in a limited-time game mode titled "The Battle of Verdansk" where every player works together to take down a train, before attempting to escape as WW2-era planes drop bombs on them. The reveal trailer was played at the end of the event, before being posted publicly on YouTube and other social media websites.

On August 25, during Gamescom, Sledgehammer Games revealed the first extended playthrough of Vanguard's campaign missions set in the Eastern Front called "Stalingrad Summer". This mission gives an insight regarding the initial invasion of Stalingrad in 1942 from the perspective of Petrova (voiced by Laura Bailey) as she tries to find a way home after an aerial attack while eliminating hostile German infantry search crews.

On September 7, during a nearly 30-minute live broadcast on YouTube, led by the members of Sledgehammer Games development team, creative director Greg Reisdorf, lead designer Zach Hodson, and associate art director Matt Abbott, in-depth details of Vanguard's multiplayer had been revealed, showcasing some components of tactical gameplay, the variations of competitive gamemodes, while emphasizing the details of the newly introduced environmental destruction gameplay features.

Absence of Activision branding 
Following the announcement of Vanguard, viewers observed that any prominent reference to Activision was conspicuously absent from the reveal trailer. This included the first use of "Call of Duty presents..." rather than "Activision presents", and the only mention of Activision being in small print for copyright purposes. Publications attributed the publisher's decision with an attempt to distance itself from Vanguard due to the California lawsuit filed against them, following incidents of sexual harassment within the company. In response to gaming journalist Stephen Totilo, an Activision spokesman said that the change was "a creative choice that reflects how Vanguard represents the next major installment in the franchise".

Multiplayer beta 
An open beta version of the multiplayer was also made available for all platforms in September 2021, presenting a selection of five maps and some multiplayer playlists, such as Team Deathmatch, Domination, Kill Confirmed and Search and Destroy, with the newly introduced Patrol and Champion Hill game modes. Those players who reach Level 20 in beta would receive a weapon blueprint available to use in Vanguard at launch and in Warzone at a later date.

Tie-in comic 
A tie-in comic series had been announced for Vanguard with the official reveal taking place on October 10, 2021, at the New York Comic Con. Attendees at the panel were given a free copy of the first issue, featuring one of the protagonists, Polina Petrova. On November 4, 2021, Activision announced the comic series would be released for free on the official Vanguard website, with the first issue going live the same day.

Release 
The game was released worldwide on November 5, 2021. Pre-orders of all editions grant "early" access to the open multiplayer beta, a cosmetic weapons pack for use in Vanguard, as well as a Mastercraft cosmetic blueprint and the Vanguard character Arthur Kingsley as an operator, both for use in Cold War and Warzone. The Ultimate Edition grants access to three additional cosmetic skin packs, plus access to the Battle Pass of a Season for Vanguard (dependent on the time of purchase), and double XP tokens. The Cross-gen Bundle and Ultimate Edition grant console players two versions of the game for use on the previous console generation (PlayStation 4 and Xbox One) and the later generation (PlayStation 5 and Xbox Series S or Xbox Series X).

Post-launch content 
As with Modern Warfare and Cold War, Vanguards post-launch content is provided free-of-charge, including new maps, game modes and seasonal events, while the game continues to monetize via the battle pass system and cosmetic bundles featured in the in-game store.

In January 2022, Activision announced a collaboration with the anime series Attack on Titan, to commemorate the release of its final season. A cosmetic bundle was released on January 20, 2022, in Vanguard and Warzone, featuring themed weapon blueprints and a skin for operator Daniel Yatsu based on the character Levi Ackerman. On February 22, 2022, a bundle was released for operator Roland Zeimet, this time based on Reiner Braun's Armored Titan form.

In March 2022, Activision released a teaser for an upcoming Vanguard update in April, featuring the addition of Snoop Dogg as a playable character. This marks the second collaboration between Snoop Dogg and the Call of Duty franchise since 2014, when the rapper provided voiceover as a multiplayer announcer in Call of Duty: Ghosts. The "Snoop Dogg Operator Bundle" was released in Vanguard and Warzone on April 19, 2022.

In April 2022, Activision released a story cinematic for the Season 3 content update, which featured a teaser for a crossover with Legendary Entertainment's MonsterVerse franchise. The collaboration was officially announced on April 21, 2022, featuring in-game events and map changes for Warzone, and cosmetic items themed after Godzilla, Kong and Mechagodzilla.

In June 2022, Activision announced a collaboration with the Terminator franchise for Vanguards Season 4 content update. The collaboration features two new cosmetic bundles, adding the characters T-800 and T-1000, as they appeared in Terminator 2: Judgment Day, as playable operators.

In August 2022, Activision announced a collaboration with The Umbrella Academy comic book series for Vanguards Season 5 content update. The collaboration features themed cosmetic bundles for the operators Lewis Howard and Wade Jackson, based on the characters Hazel and Cha-Cha.

Reception 

Call of Duty: Vanguard received "mixed or average reviews", according to review aggregator Metacritic.

IGNs Simon Cardy awarded the game a 7 out of 10, summarizing their review by saying, "Call of Duty: Vanguards highly polished campaign provides a healthy amount of fun, even if its brief length and lack of variety lead it to fall short of the classic pieces of war cinema it's trying to emulate." Clement Goh of CGMagazine wrote that "Call of Duty: Vanguard falls in the predictable traps of an annual release, but pulls through with a fun campaign and multiplayer at the cost of duller Zombies", also giving the game a 7 out of 10.

John Walker of Kotaku and Yussef Cole of Polygon criticized Vanguards handling of progressivism in the story and characters, feeling it suffered from tokenism and that its attempt to "wokewash" history and avoid controversy was disingenuous and cowardly. Walker also criticized the game's lack of player freedom and the artificial intelligence compared to 2003's Call of Duty, and while praising the graphics as "astonishing", wrote it was "all for absolutely nothing".

Vanguards Zombies mode was negatively received by players and critics alike, with complaints about the lack of content compared to past iterations of the mode. Luke Winkie of IGN gave Zombies a 5 out of 10, writing it had "little imagination beyond bigger damage numbers sparking out of the heads of its undead". Writing for GameRant, Richard Warren felt that Zombies fell short in numerous areas, including its use of multiplayer assets, absence of Wonder Weapons, and lack of Easter eggs, the latter of which they considered the "biggest thing that makes Zombies unique".

Sales 

The PlayStation 4 version of Call of Duty: Vanguard sold 28,321 copies within its first week of release in Japan, making it the fourteenth best-selling retail game of the week in the country. The PlayStation 5 version sold 12,754 copies in Japan throughout the same week, making it the fifth bestselling retail game of the week in the country. In May 2022, Activision announced that Vanguard had failed to meet their sales expectations, attributing this to the World War II setting and a "lack of innovation".

Quran pages controversy 
Following Vanguards release, players discovered that the Zombies map "Der Anfang" contained scattered pages of the Quran on the floor, some being bloodstained. In response to criticism from players, Activision removed the pages from the game and issued an apology on Twitter: "There was content insensitive to Muslims included in the game, and it has been removed. It was not supposed to exist as it appeared in the game. We deeply apologise."

Accolades

Notes

References

External links 
 Official website

2021 video games
Activision games
Vanguard
First-person shooters
Mass murder in fiction
Multiplayer and single-player video games
PlayStation 4 games
PlayStation 5 games
Video games about World War II alternate histories
Video games about Nazi Germany
Video games featuring female protagonists
Video games set in France
Video games set in the Soviet Union
Video games set in Papua New Guinea
Video games set in Japan
Video games set in Libya
Video games set in Egypt
Video games set in Italy
Video games set in the United Kingdom
Video games set in the United States
Video games set in Morocco
Video games set in the Solomon Islands
Video games with cross-platform play
Windows games
World War II first-person shooters
Xbox One games
Xbox Series X and Series S games
Video games set in the 1940s
Pacific War video games
Video games about the Special Air Service
Sledgehammer Games games
Video games developed in the United States